The old Central Government Offices was home to many of the Hong Kong Government's departments from 1847 to 1954. Built in 1847 as the Old Secretariat Building, it was also home to the territory's Legislative Council from the 1930s to 1954.

The two-storey colonial building was demolished in 1954 to make way for the new Central Government Offices.

References

External links
 Central Government Offices (1848-1955)
 Central Government Offices, Historic and Architectural Appraisal, 2009

Government buildings in Hong Kong
Landmarks in Hong Kong
Hong Kong - old Central Governnment Offices
Legislative Council of Hong Kong
Government buildings completed in 1847
Buildings and structures demolished in 1954
1847 establishments in Hong Kong
Demolished buildings and structures in Hong Kong
1954 disestablishments in Hong Kong